Enzo Héctor Trossero (born 23 May 1953), nicknamed El Vikingo (the Viking), is an Argentine footballer and coach.

Club career 
He began his playing career at Argentine minnows Belgrano de San Francisco but he soon moved on to Colón de Santa Fe, and in 1975 he arrived at Independiente. In this team he had two phases: from 1975 to 1979, when he was transferred to FC Nantes Atlantique of France, and from 1981 to 1985. During that time he won three Argentine titles (1977–78 and 1983), a Copa Libertadores (1984) and an Intercontinental Cup (1984). He was named as one of the club's best defender during Independiente's 90th anniversary.

International career 
He had great attacking prowess for a defender, he scored 55 goals in 308 games during his time with Independiente. He made the Argentina national football team for the 1982 FIFA World Cup in Spain, but he did not manage to play in any game. He played in the qualifying matches for the 1986 FIFA World Cup, but he was not called for the tournament itself.

Coaching career 
During his coaching career he has coached Club Atlético Huracán, Talleres de Córdoba, and his former club Independiente de Avellaneda. Abroad he has coached in Switzerland where he was league champion with FC Sion and also coached the Swiss national team. He coached in Guatemala with CSD Municipal and won the UNCAF Club Tournament and a record 5 straight league championships. On 4 November 2009 Godoy Cruz Antonio Tomba officials have hired the coach to replace Diego Cocca, Trossero recently quit Saudi Arabian club Al Shabab. On 29 December 2009 Godoy Cruz Antonio Tomba officials have fired the coach after just six matches due to poor results: three draws and three losses. As replacement was named Trossero's assistant Daniel Ondra, the club is but in negotiation with former Gimnasia y Esgrima La Plata coach Leonardo Madelón

Honours 
Independiente
 Nacional: 1977, 1978
 Metropolitano: 1983
 Copa Libertadores: 1984
 Intercontinental Cup: 1984

Nantes
 Ligue 1: 1980

References 

1953 births
Living people
Footballers from Santa Fe, Argentina
Association football defenders
Argentine footballers
Argentina international footballers
1982 FIFA World Cup players
1983 Copa América players
Club Atlético Colón footballers
FC Sion players
FC Sion managers
San Martín de Tucumán managers
Estudiantes de La Plata footballers
Club Atlético Independiente footballers
FC Nantes players
Expatriate footballers in France
Expatriate footballers in Switzerland
Expatriate footballers in Mexico
Argentine expatriate footballers
Deportivo Toluca F.C. players
Argentine football managers
Club Atlético Huracán managers
Estudiantes de La Plata managers
Club Atlético Colón managers
Club Atlético Independiente managers
Godoy Cruz Antonio Tomba managers
Switzerland national football team managers
C.S.D. Municipal managers
Expatriate football managers in Guatemala
Argentine Primera División players
Ligue 1 players
Liga MX players
Expatriate football managers in Saudi Arabia
Expatriate football managers in Switzerland
Argentine expatriate sportspeople in France
Argentine expatriate sportspeople in Mexico
Argentine expatriate sportspeople in Saudi Arabia
Al Shabab FC (Riyadh) managers
Ittihad FC managers
Saudi Professional League managers
Argentine expatriate football managers
FC Lugano managers